My Song Goes Round the World is a 1934 British musical film directed by Richard Oswald and starring Joseph Schmidt, John Loder and Charlotte Ander. It was an English-language version of the 1933 German film A Song Goes Round the World, also directed by Oswald.

Cast
 Joseph Schmidt as Ricardo 
 John Loder as Rico 
 Charlotte Ander as Nina 
 Jack Barty as Simoni 
 Jimmy Godden as Manager 
 Hal Gordon as Stage Manager

References

External links

1934 films
British musical films
1930s English-language films
Films directed by Richard Oswald
1934 musical films
Films set in Venice
Films shot at British International Pictures Studios
British multilingual films
British black-and-white films
1934 multilingual films
1930s British films